U-64 may refer to one of the following German submarines:

  , a Type U 63 submarine launched in 1916 and that served in the First World War until sunk on 17 June 1918
 During the First World War, Germany also had these submarines with similar names:
 , a Type UB III submarine launched in 1917 and surrendered on 21 November 1918; broken up at Fareham in 1921
, a Type UC II submarine launched in 1917 and sunk on 20 June 1918
 , a Type IXB submarine that served in the Second World War until sunk on 13 April 1940

Submarines of Germany